Ab Anjir-e Olya (also Romanized as Āb Anjīr-e ‘Olyā; also known as Āb Anjīr-e Bālā) is a village in Lishtar Rural District, in the Central District of Gachsaran County, Kohgiluyeh and Boyer-Ahmad Province, Iran. At the 2006 census, its population was 109, in 28 families.

References 

Populated places in Gachsaran County